Nate James (born August 7, 1977) is an American former basketball player and former head coach at Austin Peay State University. He played college basketball for the Duke Blue Devils.

College career
James, a 6'6" (1.98 m) swingman out of Saint John's at Prospect Hall, played for coach Mike Krzyzewski at Duke from 1996 to 2001.  After appearing sparingly as a freshman, James suffered a medical redshirt in his sophomore season after six games.  Returning in the 1998–99 season, James became a key reserve for the Blue Devils' 1999 Final Four team, averaging 5.0 points and 2.6 rebounds in 14.7 minutes per game.

In his junior year, James was named co-captain of the 1999–2000 team with Chris Carrawell and Shane Battier.  He also moved into the starting lineup and upped his averages to 11.0 points and 4.5 rebounds per game.  As a senior, James was again named co-captain and led the Blue Devils to the 2001 NCAA championship.  He was named third team All-Atlantic Coast Conference and tallied 12.3 points and 5.2 rebounds per game for the Blue Devils.  During his time at Duke, James scored 1,116 points and due to his redshirt year became the first player in ACC history to be a member of five regular-season conference championships.

Professional career
Following the close of his college career, James was not drafted by the National Basketball Association.  After stints with the Summer League teams of the Washington Wizards and Sacramento Kings, he embarked on an international career.  James' career would take him to the Philippines, France, Japan, Bosnia, the Netherlands, Brazil, Hungary and Poland.  James was a part of league championship teams in the Netherlands and Hungary.

Coaching career
In 2008, James retired from basketball and took a role as assistant strength and conditioning coach at his alma mater.  Following the departure of assistant Johnny Dawkins to Stanford, James was elevated to a full assistant role for the 2009–10 season.  Duke went on to win the 2010 national championship, making James the first person to win championships at Duke as both a player and as a coach.  James would stay on as a full assistant for another season before moving to a special assistant role as former Blue Devil Jeff Capel joined the staff. On March 27, 2013, head coach Mike Krzyzewski announced James would be moving back to the bench, naming him an assistant coach for the 2013–14 season, following the announcement that Associate Head Coach Chris Collins would leave the Blue Devils at end of the season to become the head coach at Northwestern University.

Following the departure of associate head coach Jeff Capel to become the head coach at the University of Pittsburgh at the end of the 2018 season, James was promoted to co-associate head coach along with Jon Scheyer.

On April 2, 2021, James was named the 13th head coach in Austin Peay history, replacing Matt Figger.

Head coaching record

References

1977 births
Living people
American expatriate basketball people in Bosnia and Herzegovina
American expatriate basketball people in Belgium
American expatriate basketball people in Brazil
American expatriate basketball people in France
American expatriate basketball people in Hungary
American expatriate basketball people in Japan
American expatriate basketball people in the Netherlands
American expatriate basketball people in the Philippines
American expatriate basketball people in Poland
American men's basketball players
Austin Peay Governors men's basketball coaches
Basketball coaches from Michigan
Basketball players from Detroit
College men's basketball head coaches in the United States
Duke Blue Devils men's basketball coaches
Duke Blue Devils men's basketball players
Heroes Den Bosch players
HKK Široki players
Philippine Basketball Association imports
Saint John's Catholic Prep (Maryland) alumni
Shooting guards
Small forwards
Sta. Lucia Realtors players
Toyama Grouses players